Max's Restaurant, sometimes known as Max's of Manila or simply Max's, is a Philippine-based multinational restaurant chain which serves fried chicken and other Filipino dishes. It is owned and operated by the Max's Group.

History
Max's Restaurant was first established in 1945, shortly after World War II, by Maximo Gimenez, a Stanford-educated teacher. Gimenez befriended the American occupation troops stationed in Quezon City, who regularly paid visits to Maximo's home for drinks; the troops later insisted that they pay for the food and beverages being served, prompting Maximo to open a café where the servicemen could be served meals. It opened its first restaurant at 21 South F Street (now Scout Tuason), Brgy. Laging Handa, Quezon City. 

Gimenez decided to open a café which initially consisted of chicken, steak and drinks. He was joined by his wife Mercedes, sister-in-law Felipa Serrano Sanvictores, his niece Ruby who managed the kitchen, and her husband Claro. Ruby managed the kitchen and created a chicken recipe which proved to be popular to the GIs stationed in the city and later to the public who have heard of Ruby's recipe.

Max's Restaurant later expanded in Metro Manila, Luzon and Cebu and to the United States, Canada, Kuwait and the United Arab Emirates, with plans of opening branches in other countries.

The company that manages Max's Restaurant, Max's Group, also currently operates Pancake House, Dencio's, Kabisera, Teriyaki Boy, Sizzlin' Steak, Le Coeur De France, Maple, Yellow Cab, Singkit, and The Chicken Rice Shop.

Locations

Max's Restaurant currently has over 170 branches in the Philippines. The chain also has branches in the U.S. states of California, Hawaii, New Jersey, Nevada, New York, Illinois, Texas and Washington. It has five locations in Canada in Toronto, Ontario, Vancouver, British Columbia, Edmonton, Alberta, Winnipeg, Manitoba, and Calgary, Alberta. In a September 2014 press event, it was announced that more branches would be opened by 2015 in: Sydney, Australia; Dubai, United Arab Emirates; and Queens, New York City. In 2016, Max's was also opened in Salmiya, Kuwait. In May 2022, Max's opened a new location in Woodside, New York.

Products

The restaurant's signature dish is its fried chicken. Aside from this, Max's Chicken also offers traditional Filipino dishes such as, kare-kare, nilagang báka, sinigang, crispy pata, tapsilog, lóngsilog, and litsón kawalî.

Marketing
In earlier television and cinema advertisements, the restaurant usually marketed itself as a place for Filipino families to get together. In 1993, it also established its slogan "Sarap to the bones!" ("Delicious to the bones!").

From April to June 2004, a popular series of television advertisements, entitled "Forever Yours" told the story of a Max's employee who was the childhood love of a popular TV celebrity, played by Piolo Pascual, their endorser from 2002 to 2011 (who currently endorses Andok's and Dunkin' Donuts). The series showed  the two characters as children, then as adults accidentally meeting at Max's. The denouement of the story is when the celebrity recognizes the employee from their childhood. This commercial became so popular that it launched the showbiz career of Isabel Oli, the model who played the employee. Oli was married to John Prats a 90s child actor.

Aside from its advertising, the story of how Max's Restaurant started has entered into popular culture. It was portrayed in the episode "Sino si Max?" ("Who is Max?") of the long-running Filipino drama anthology Maalaala Mo Kaya. Some of their other celebrity endorsers were Gary Valenciano (1996–1999, endorsed Jollibee again in 2018), Carla Abellana (2002) and Coco Martin (2012–2014, who also switched to Jollibee via Mang Inasal in 2016).

See also
 List of fast-food chicken restaurants
 List of Philippine restaurant chains

References

External links
Official website

Restaurants established in 1945
Restaurant chains in the Philippines
Fast-food poultry restaurants
Philippine companies established in 1945